Gary Howlett (born 2 April 1963) is an Irish former international footballer and member of Brighton & Hove Albion's 1983 FA Cup final team. Howlett joined Brighton in the early 1980s from Coventry City. Before that he played for Home Farm. The highlight of his Brighton career came in the 1983 final against Manchester United, where he crossed for Gordon Smith to head the first goal in a match that ended 2–2. Manchester United won the replay 4–0.

He won one cap for the Republic of Ireland, against China in 1984. Howlett, whose playing career was hampered by injuries, later joined AFC Bournemouth (1984–88) and York City (1988–91), and played on loan for Aldershot (1987) and Chester City (1987–88).

Also scored once in four appearances for the Republic of Ireland U21 scoring once.

He later returned to Ireland to play for Shelbourne, making his League of Ireland debut on 1 March 1991. He later had a spell on the coaching staff with Bohemian FC under Stephen Kenny and Gareth Farrelly and was caretaker manager of the club between Kenny's departure and Farrelly's arrival. He later played in the Irish League for Crusaders.

Howlett currently manages Killester United in the Leinster Senior League.

Honours
League of Ireland: 1
 Shelbourne F.C. 1992

References

External links

The Official PFAI Guide

1963 births
Place of birth missing (living people)
Living people
Association football midfielders
Republic of Ireland association footballers
Home Farm F.C. players
Coventry City F.C. players
Brighton & Hove Albion F.C. players
Chester City F.C. players
Aldershot F.C. players
AFC Bournemouth players
York City F.C. players
Crusaders F.C. players
English Football League players
Republic of Ireland international footballers
Republic of Ireland under-21 international footballers
Shelbourne F.C. players
League of Ireland players
Drumcondra F.C. managers
Leinster Senior League (association football) managers
Republic of Ireland football managers
FA Cup Final players